This article provides information on candidates who stood for the 1996 Australian federal election. The election was held on 2 March 1996.

Redistributions and seat changes
Redistributions of electoral boundaries occurred in Victoria, Queensland and the Australian Capital Territory.
In Victoria, the Labor-held seat of Corinella was abolished. The Liberal-held seats of Bruce and Isaacs became notionally Labor, while the Labor-held seats of Dunkley and McEwen became notionally Liberal.
The member for Corinella, Alan Griffin (Labor), contested Bruce.
Victorian Senator Gareth Evans (Labor) contested Holt.
In Queensland, the notionally Liberal seat of Longman was created. The Labor-held seat of Forde became notionally Liberal, and the National-held seat of Hinkler became notionally Labor.
In the Australian Capital Territory, the notionally Labor seat of Namadgi was created.
The member for Canberra, Brendan Smyth (Liberal), contested Namadgi.
ACT Senator Bob McMullan (Labor) contested Canberra.

Retiring Members and Senators

Labor
 Michael Duffy MP (Holt, Vic)
 Wendy Fatin MP (Brand, WA)
 Eric Fitzgibbon MP (Hunter, NSW)
 Russ Gorman MP (Greenway, NSW)
 Alan Griffiths MP (Maribyrnong, Vic)
 Chris Haviland MP (Macarthur, NSW)
 Brian Howe MP (Batman, Vic)
 Ben Humphreys MP (Griffith, Qld)
 Jeannette McHugh MP (Grayndler, NSW)
 Gary Punch MP (Barton, NSW)
 David Simmons MP (Calare, NSW)
 Peter Staples MP (Jagajaga, Vic)
Senator Bryant Burns (Qld)
Senator Gerry Jones (Qld)

Liberal
 Ken Aldred MP (Deakin, Vic)
 David Connolly MP (Bradfield, NSW)
 Don Dobie MP (Cook, NSW)
 Steele Hall MP (Boothby, SA)
Senator Baden Teague (SA)

National
 Ray Braithwaite MP (Dawson, Qld)
 Bruce Lloyd MP (Murray, Vic)

Democrats
Senator Sid Spindler (Vic)

Independent
 Ted Mack MP (North Sydney, NSW)
Senator Noel Crichton-Browne (WA) – elected as Liberal
Senator John Devereux (Tas) – elected as Labor

House of Representatives
Sitting members at the time of the election are shown in bold text. Successful candidates are highlighted in the relevant colour. Where there is possible confusion, an asterisk (*) is also used.

Australian Capital Territory

New South Wales

Northern Territory

Queensland

South Australia

Tasmania

Victoria

Western Australia

Senate
Sitting Senators are shown in bold text. Tickets that elected at least one Senator are highlighted in the relevant colour. Successful candidates are identified by an asterisk (*).

Australian Capital Territory
Two seats were up for election. The Labor Party was defending one seat. The Liberal Party was defending one seat.

New South Wales
Six seats were up for election. The Labor Party was defending three seats. The Liberal-National Coalition was defending two seats. The Australian Democrats were defending one seat. Senators Michael Baume (Liberal), John Faulkner (Labor), Michael Forshaw (Labor), Sandy Macdonald (National), Belinda Neal (Labor) and John Tierney (Liberal) were not up for re-election.

Northern Territory
Two seats were up for election. The Labor Party was defending one seat. The Country Liberal Party was defending one seat.

Queensland
Six seats were up for election. The Labor Party was defending two seats. The Liberal Party was defending two seats. The National Party was defending one seat. The Australian Democrats were defending one seat. Senators Mal Colston (Labor), David MacGibbon (Liberal), Bill O'Chee (National), Warwick Parer (Liberal), Margaret Reynolds (Labor) and John Woodley (Democrats) were not up for re-election.

South Australia
Six seats were up for election. The Labor Party was defending two seats. The Liberal Party was defending three seats. The Australian Democrats were defending one seat. Senators Nick Bolkus (Labor), Alan Ferguson (Liberal), Dominic Foreman (Labor), Meg Lees (Democrats), Nick Minchin (Liberal) and Amanda Vanstone (Liberal) were not up for re-election.

Tasmania
Six seats were up for election. The Labor Party was defending two seats. The Liberal Party was defending three seats. The Australian Democrats were defending one seat. Senators Eric Abetz (Liberal), John Coates (Labor), Kay Denman (Labor), Brian Gibson (Liberal), Brian Harradine (Independent) and Shayne Murphy (Labor) were not up for re-election.

Victoria
Six seats were up for election. The Labor Party was defending two seats. The Liberal-National Coalition was defending three seats. The Australian Democrats were defending one seat. Senators Kim Carr (Labor), Jacinta Collins (Labor), Julian McGauran (National), Jim Short (Liberal) and Judith Troeth (Liberal) were not up for re-election. The seat held by Senator Gareth Evans (Labor) was also not up for re-election but was vacant due to his resignation to contest the House of Representatives; this vacancy was filled in April by Stephen Conroy.

Western Australia
Six seats were up for election. The Labor Party was defending two seats. The Liberal Party was defending three seats. The Greens WA were defending one seat. Senators Ian Campbell (Liberal), Peter Cook (Labor), Chris Ellison (Liberal), Chris Evans (Labor), Sue Knowles (Liberal) and Dee Margetts (Greens) were not up for re-election.

Summary by party 

Beside each party is the number of seats contested by that party in the House of Representatives for each state, as well as an indication of whether the party contested the Senate election in the respective state.

See also
 1996 Australian federal election
 Members of the Australian House of Representatives, 1993–1996
 Members of the Australian House of Representatives, 1996–1998
 Members of the Australian Senate, 1993–1996
 Members of the Australian Senate, 1996–1999
 List of political parties in Australia

Notes

References

Adam Carr's Election Archive - House of Representatives 1996
Adam Carr's Election Archive - Senate 1996

1996 in Australia
Candidates for Australian federal elections